The 2013 Istanbul Park Superbike World Championship round is the eleventh round of the 2013 Superbike World Championship season. It took place on the weekend of September 13–15, 2013 at the Istanbul Park located in Istanbul, Turkey.

Results

Superbike race 1 classification

Race 2 classification

Supersport race classification

External links
Superpole at Roadracing World
Istanbul WSBK: All Saturday’s qualifying times at Bike Sport News

Istanbul Park Round
Istanbul Park Superbike
Motorsport competitions in Turkey
Sport in Istanbul
International sports competitions hosted by Turkey
September 2013 sports events in Turkey